Tagetitoxin (TGT) is a bacterial phytotoxin produced by Pseudomonas  syringae  pv.  tagetis.

Chemical structure
When TGT was first isolated, it was only partially characterized. The first proposed chemical structure of TGT involved an eight-membered ring, but this was revised shortly afterward to a bicyclic structure (shown at right) based on NMR and mass spectrometry.  This structure, however, has been questioned.  The absolute configuration remains undetermined, and attempts at confirming the structure by organic synthesis are underway. Recently Porter et al. published a revised structure of TGT based on extensive 2D NMR data.

Mechanism of action
TGT interferes with development of chloroplasts in young plant leaves thereby causing chlorosis. The natural target of the toxin is chloroplast RNA polymerase. Chloroplast RNA polymerase belongs to ubiquitous family of multisubunit RNA polymerases (RNAP) and is most closely related to bacterial enzymes. In vitro, TGT inhibits bacterial RNAPs from Escherichia coli and Thermus thermophilus, and eukaryotic RNA polymerase III. In contrast, eukaryotic RNA polymerase I and II as well as single-subunit RNA polymerases of bacteriophage T7 and SP6 are relatively insensitive to the compound. TGT binds in the RNAP active site and inhibits initiation and elongation phases of transcription as well as pyrophosphorolysis of the nascent RNA. However, the detailed mechanism of inhibition remains a subject of heated debate.

It has been suggested that TGT forms a ternary RNAP-NTP-TGT complex and inhibits phosphodiester bond synthesis either by binding an inhibitory magnesium ion or by trapping a flexible active site domain in an inactive conformation. The third theory suggests that TGT forms predominantly a binary RNAP-TGT complex and inhibits RNAP translocation along the DNA by mimicking the transcription byproduct pyrophosphate.

References

Plant toxins
Acetate esters
Carboxylic acids
Organophosphates
RNA polymerase inhibitors
Carboxamides
Alcohols